Lori Geary is an American news anchor and current anchor of "The Georgia Gang" on WAGA-TV. Geary is a former political reporter for WSB-TV in Atlanta and a former anchor for Headline News.

Early life 
Geary attended North Allegheny High School in Pittsburgh and anchored its newscast.

Education 
Geary majored in Broadcast Journalism at Syracuse University's Newhouse School of Communications and graduated magna cum laude in three years.

Career 
Geary started her first reporting job at WRDW-TV in Augusta, Georgia where she was quickly promoted to noon anchor and later moved to Raleigh, North Carolina where she covered politics and conducted some memorable interviews with Jesse Helms, Elizabeth Dole, and John Edwards.

Geary won several awards from the Society of Professional Journalists and the Georgia Associated Press and is also proud of her two Emmy Awards that she received during her tenure at WSB.

In January 1998, while anchoring at CNN Headline News, Geary joined WSB-TV.

On November 11, 2016, she announced via Facebook that she would step away from her full time duties as the political reporter at WSB after 19 years to spend more time with her two children and start her own communications firm to give herself more flexibility. "A big thank you to my husband, Bobby Talbert, who has held down the fort of afternoon pick-ups – soccer and baseball practices, doctors & dentists appointments and everything in between when I had to be on the air," she wrote. "It’s my turn to help! It’s a big decision but I hope and pray there are big opportunities ahead. Thank you all for your loyalty and support for the past 19 years at WSB-TV." She said that she still plans to make guest appearances on the station and will continue to be around during contentious political elections.

On September 25, 2018, Geary joined FOX 5 Atlanta as host of the station's Sunday morning political show, "The Georgia Gang."

Personal life
Geary is married and is an avid puppy lover and enjoys spending time with her puppy Georgi.

References

American television news anchors
Living people
CNN people
Year of birth missing (living people)
S.I. Newhouse School of Public Communications alumni